Linda Sue Seger  (born August 27, 1945) is an American author and former screenwriting consultant. She is best known for her books on screenwriting.

Education and career
Seger grew up in Peshtigo, Wisconsin. She received an undergraduate degree from Colorado College in 1967. She went on to receive an MA degree from the Pacific School of Religion on Religion in Arts in 1973, and a Th.D in Drama and Theology from the affiliated Graduate Theological Union in 1976.

Seger is the author of several books on the subject of screenwriting. She also worked as a script consultant, and had consulted on more than 80 produced films and television episodes until her retirement in 2020. In addition to books on screenwriting, she has written several books on themes around spirituality and religion.

Selected books

On screenwriting

 (Cited over 250 times according to Google Scholar.)

On religion and spirituality

References

External links 
 
 
 

Living people
1945 births
Colorado College alumni
Pacific School of Religion alumni
Film theorists
Writers of books about writing fiction
Screenwriting instructors
20th-century American women writers
21st-century American women writers
20th-century American non-fiction writers
21st-century American non-fiction writers
American women non-fiction writers